Djair may refer to:

Djair language, a language of Papua, Indonesia
Djair Kaye de Brito, Brazilian footballer, nicknamed 'Djair'
Djair Baptista Machado, Brazilian footballer, nicknamed 'Djair'
Djair Veiga Francisco Junior, Brazilian footballer, nicknamed 'Djair'
Djair Parfitt-Williams, Bermudan footballer